Czernięcin may refer to the following places in Poland:

Czernięcin Główny
Czernięcin Poduchowny